Float may refer to:

Arts and entertainment

Music

Albums
 Float (Aesop Rock album), 2000
 Float (Flogging Molly album), 2008
 Float (Styles P album), 2013

Songs
 "Float" (Tim and the Glory Boys song), 2022
 "Float", by Bush from Golden State, 2001
 "Float," by Eden from Vertigo, 2018
 "Float", by The Music from The Music, 2002
 "Float", by RAH Band from Mystery
 "Float", by Russell Dickerson from Yours, 2017

Other uses
 Float (b-boy move), a balance-intensive breakdance move
 Float (sculpture), a 1990 public artwork by American artist Peter Flanary
 Float (film), a 2019 American animated short film produced by Pixar
 Lowboy (trailer), called a float in Eastern Canada usage
 Float (parade)

Beverages
 Float, an ice cream soda
 Floats (drink), line of bottled beverages designed to imitate the taste of an ice cream soda
 Float (bartending technique), the layering of liquid or ingredients on the top of a drink

Computing 
 Float (computing)
 Float, a Cascading Style Sheets attribute
 Float, a single precision binary  computer number format

Finance and economics 
 Float (money supply)
 Float, the act of moving a currency to a floating exchange rate
 Cash float, the money in a cash register needed at the beginning of a business day in order to give change to customers
 Public float, the total number of shares publicly owned and available for trading, after subtracting restricted shares from the total outstanding shares
 Stock market float, an initial public offering (IPO), particularly in British English
 Insurance float, investable funds collected from premiums but not paid out in claims

Fishing-related 
 Fishing float, a bite indicator used in angling
 Fishing net float, small floats attached along one side of the net so that it hangs vertically in the water
 Glass float, a type of large float used to keep fishing nets or droplines afloat

Science
 Float (oceanographic instrument platform)
 Float voltage, an external electric potential required to keep a battery fully charged
 Float (geology) is a rock fragment that is not directly connected to an underlying or nearby outcrop or formation.

Tools
 Float (liquid level), a fluid-level indicator used in process engineering and plumbing
 Float (woodworking), a tool used to cut, flatten and/or smooth wood via abrasion
 Concrete float, a finishing tool for smoothing wet concrete surfaces
 Float, a rasp-like tool sporting sharp cutting teeth, sometimes used on horse teeth

Vehicles 
 Float (horse-drawn), a form of two-wheeled horse-drawn cart with a low loadbed
 Float (nautical), an external, buoyant section of a water vessel (such as a pontoon boat or floatplane)
 Float (parade), a decorated vehicle or moving platform, could be animal- or man-drawn or motorized, used in a festive parade
 Float shifting or "floating gears", the practice of shifting gears on a manual transmission without using the clutch
 Milk float, a small battery electric vehicle specifically designed for the delivery of fresh milk
 Valve float, a condition of an internal combustion engine

Other uses
 Float (project management), a time-management device
 Float railway station, a former railway station in County Westmeath, Ireland
 Swimming float or pool float, a device used to aid swimmers with buoyancy
 Float, an animal name for a group of crocodiles

See also 
 Buoyancy
 Floating (disambiguation)
 Flotation (disambiguation)

References